The American Arachnological Society (AAS) is a scientific organization founded in 1972 in order to promote the study of arachnids by seeking to achieve closer cooperation and understanding between amateur and professional arachnologists along with publication of the Journal of Arachnology. The society holds annual meetings around the United States and membership is open to all individuals who share the common objectives held by the society.

Journal
The AAS publishes the Journal of Arachnology.

Selected publications

See also
 International Society of Arachnology

References

External links
 AAS Constitution

Arachnological societies
Environmental organizations based in Rhode Island
Zoology organizations
Scientific organizations established in 1972
Learned societies of the United States